Schinia velaris is a moth of the family Noctuidae. It is found in North America, including Arizona and California.

The wingspan is about 25 mm.

The larvae feed on Lepidospartum squamatum.

External links
Images
Butterflies and Moths of North America

Schinia
Moths of North America
Moths described in 1878